Madeline Aaron (born October 25, 1994) is an American former pair skater. With former partner Max Settlage, she is the 2014 CS U.S. Classic bronze medalist, a two-time U.S. national pewter medalist (2015–2016), and the 2014 U.S. national junior champion.

Personal life
Madeline Aaron was born October 25, 1994 in Scottsdale, Arizona. After attending Chaparral High School, she enrolled at the University of Colorado Colorado Springs as a part-time nursing student. She is the sister of Max Aaron—the 2013 U.S. champion in men's singles—and Molly Aaron, a pair skater.

Career
Aaron began skating at age five. Competing with Craig Norris, she placed fifth on the novice level at the Pacific Coast Sectionals in the 2009–10 season.

Partnership with Settlage 
Aaron was paired with Max Settlage in May 2010 by coach Dalilah Sappenfield. The pair, both clockwise jumpers, moved from Arizona to Colorado for training.

Aaron/Settlage began competing on the ISU Junior Grand Prix series in 2011. They won two JGP medals — bronze in Lake Placid in 2012 and silver in Belarus in 2013. After winning the U.S. national junior title in January 2014, they were sent to the World Junior Championships and placed fifth. 
Aaron/Settlage moved up to the senior level in the 2014–15 season. They were assigned to the 2014 Skate Canada International after the withdrawal of Zhang/Bartholomay. They were awarded the pewter medal for fourth place at the 2015 U.S. Championships.

After Settlage developed a lower back injury, in August 2015, the pair missed about three months of training. Aaron sustained a mild concussion in the summer when she fell on a mohawk turn. The pair decided to withdraw from their Grand Prix event, the 2015 Cup of China, and returned to competition at the 2015 CS Tallinn Trophy, where they placed fifth. At the 2016 U.S. Championships, they won the pewter medal for the second consecutive year.

Interviewed in late June 2016, Aaron/Settlage said that they planned to use a revised version of their 2015–16 short program and Scheherazade for their free skate. They were invited to the 2016 Skate America but withdrew from the event due to the end of their partnership. They made the announcement on August 10, 2016, with Aaron saying that she was taking some time off.

Programs
(with Settlage)

Competitive highlights
GP: Grand Prix; CS: Challenger Series; JGP: Junior Grand Prix

With Settlage

With Norris

References

External links

Madeline Aaron / Max Settlage at IceNetwork.com

1994 births
American female pair skaters
Living people
Sportspeople from Scottsdale, Arizona
21st-century American women
20th-century American women